Zosne cachita is a species of longhorn beetle in the tribe Saperdini in the genus Zosne that was discovered by Heller in 1922.

References

Saperdini
Beetles described in 1922